Maelle Millet (born 22 August 2004) is a French rhythmic gymnast.

Personal life 
Maelle took up rhythmic gymnastics at age six after a demonstration near her home. She now trains for 26 hours per week at the national youth training hub (Pole Espoir) in Montpellier, France, her favourite apparatuses are ball and ribbon and her ultimate ambition is to compete at the 2024 Olympic Games in Paris.

Career

Junior 
At the first Junior World Championships in Rhythmic Gymnastics in Moscow in 2019 she placed 14th with ball, the only apparatus she competed with.

Senior 
She debuted in senior category in 2021 at World Cup Sofia, where she ended 19th in the all-around and didn't qualify for finals. She was selected to represent France at the 2021 European Championship in Varna, Bulgaria, along with Kseniya Moustafaeva, she competed with four apparatuses and ended her competition mid ranking. Millet also competed at the World Championship in the same year, placing 19th in the all around.

In 2022 she took part at the World Cups in Sofia and Baku, qualifying for the hoop final and ball final in the Bulgarian stage : she won her first world cup medal, a bronze with hoop. Despite winning the French nationals she was only named reserve gymnast for the 2022 European Championship.

Routine music information

References 

French rhythmic gymnasts
2004 births
Living people
21st-century French women